The 1992 San Francisco Giants season was the Giants' 110th season in Major League Baseball, their 35th season in San Francisco since their move from New York following the 1957 season, and their 33rd at Candlestick Park. The team finished in fifth place in the National League West with a record of 72 wins and 90 losses.

This year, Giants owner Bob Lurie agreed in principle to sell his team to a Tampa Bay-based group of investors led by Vince Naimoli, who would then move the team to St. Petersburg.  However, in November 1992, National League owners nixed the move under pressure from San Francisco officials, and the Giants were sold to a group that kept them in San Francisco.

Offseason
 December 11, 1991: Kevin Mitchell was traded by the San Francisco Giants with Mike Remlinger to the Seattle Mariners for Bill Swift, Mike Jackson, and Dave Burba.
January 13, 1992: Cory Snyder was signed as a free agent with the San Francisco Giants.
 January 30, 1992: Steve Lake was signed as a free agent with the San Francisco Giants.

Regular season

Opening Day starters

Season standings

Record vs. opponents

Notable transactions
April 2, 1992: Steve Lake was released by the San Francisco Giants.
June 1, 1992: Marvin Benard was drafted by the San Francisco Giants in the 50th round of the 1992 amateur draft. Player signed June 4, 1992.

Major League debuts
Batters:
Craig Colbert (Apr 6)
Steve Hosey (Aug 29)
Jim McNamara (Apr 9)
John Patterson (Apr 6)
Pitchers:
Larry Carter (Sep 6)
Jim Pena (Jul 7)
Pat Rapp (Jul 10)
Steve Reed (Aug 30)
Kevin Rogers (Sep 4)

Roster

Player stats

Batting
Note: Pos = Position; G = Games played; AB = At bats; H = Hits; Avg. = Batting average; HR = Home runs; RBI = Runs batted in

Other batters
Note: G = Games played; AB = At bats; H = Hits; Avg. = Batting average; HR = Home runs; RBI = Runs batted in

Pitching

Starting pitchers
Note: G = Games pitched; IP = Innings pitched; W = Wins; L = Losses; ERA = Earned run average; SO = Strikeouts

Other pitchers
Note: G = Games pitched; IP = Innings pitched; W = Wins; L = Losses; ERA = Earned run average; SO = Strikeouts

Relief pitchers
Note: G = Games pitched; W = Wins; L = Losses; SV = Saves; ERA = Earned run average; SO = Strikeouts

Award winners
 Mike Felder CF, Willie Mac Award
All-Star Game

Farm system

References

External links
 1992 San Francisco Giants at Baseball Reference
 1992 San Francisco Giants at Baseball Almanac

San Francisco Giants seasons
San Francisco Giants season
San Fran